Musasa an Indo-Aryan language of Nepal. It belongs to the Bihari group and is spoken in the Janakpur, Kosi and Sagarmatha zones. It is predominantly spoken by members of the Musahar caste.

References

Bihari languages